Ružica is a Serbo-Croatian feminine given name, a diminutive of Ruža ("Rose"), cognate of Rosie. It may refer to:

 Ružica Meglaj-Rimac, Croatian basketball player
 Ružica Sokić, Serbian actress
 Ružica Džankić (born 1994), Croatian basketball player

Feminine given names
Slavic feminine given names
Croatian feminine given names
Serbian feminine given names